Clifford Paul "Cliff" Stoll (born June 4, 1950) is an American astronomer, author and teacher.

He is best known for his investigation in 1986, while working as a systems administrator at the Lawrence Berkeley National Laboratory, that led to the capture of hacker Markus Hess, and for Stoll's subsequent book The Cuckoo's Egg, in which he details the investigation.

Stoll has written three books, articles in the non-specialist press (e.g., in Scientific American) on the Curta mechanical calculator and the slide rule, and is a frequent contributor to the mathematics YouTube channel Numberphile.

Early life and education
Cliff Stoll attended Hutchinson Central Technical High School in Buffalo, New York. He earned a B.S. in Astronomy in 1973 from the University at Buffalo (SUNY).  While studying for his undergraduate degree at SUNY Buffalo, Stoll worked in the university's electronic music laboratory and was mentored by Robert Moog.

He received his PhD from University of Arizona in 1980.

Career

During the 1960s and 1970s, Stoll was assistant chief engineer at WBFO, a public radio station in his hometown of Buffalo, New York.

In 1986, while employed as a systems administrator at the Lawrence Berkeley National Laboratory, Stoll investigated a tenacious hacker—later identified as KGB recruit Markus Hess—who stole passwords, pirated multiple computer accounts, and attempted to breach US military security. After identifying the intrusion, Stoll set up a honeypot for Hess, eventually tracking him down and passing details to the authorities. It is recognized as one of the first examples of digital forensics. At the time, gaining cooperation from law enforcement was a challenge due to the relatively new nature of the crime. He described the events of his investigation in The Cuckoo's Egg: Tracking a Spy Through the Maze of Computer Espionage and the paper "Stalking the Wily Hacker". Stoll's book was later chronicled in an episode of WGBH's NOVA titled "The KGB, the Computer, and Me", which aired on PBS stations in 1990.

In his 1995 book Silicon Snake Oil and an accompanying article in Newsweek, Stoll raised questions about the influence of the Internet on future society, and whether it would be beneficial. He made various predictions in the article, such as calling e-commerce nonviable (due to a lack of personal contact and secure online funds transfers) and the future of printed news publications ("no online database will replace your daily newspaper"). When the article resurfaced on Boing Boing in 2010, Stoll left a self-deprecating comment: "Of my many mistakes, flubs, and howlers, few have been as public as my 1995 howler ... Now, whenever I think I know what's happening, I temper my thoughts: Might be wrong, Cliff ..."

Stoll was an eighth-grade physics teacher at Tehiyah Day School, in El Cerrito, California, and later taught physics to home-schooled teenagers. Stoll was a regular contributor to MSNBC's The Site. Stoll is an FCC licensed amateur radio operator with the call sign K7TA. He appears frequently on Brady Haran's YouTube channel Numberphile.

Stoll sells blown glass Klein bottles on the internet through his company Acme Klein Bottles. He stores his inventory in the crawlspace underneath his home in Oakland, California, and accesses it when needed with a homemade miniature robotic forklift.

Books

References

External links
 Stoll's page at Leigh Speakers Bureau
 
 
 
 Stalking the Wily Hacker copy at textfiles.com, May 1988
 Picture of Stoll from an interview with by Pro-Linux Magazine, February 9, 2005 
 2004 audio interview with Clifford Stoll by Karen Saupe (RealAudio)
 Cliff Stoll and Jonathan Zittrain on When Countries Collide Online: Internet Spies, Cyberwar, and Government Skullduggery, MediaBerkman, February 8, 2010 (1:21 h), Video (OGG video), Podcast (MP3, OGG audio)
 Talk by Cliff Stoll April 4, 1996
 One of Stoll's Klein bottles examined by Adam Savage (YouTube), November 1, 2021

1950 births
Living people
American astronomers
American technology writers
American non-fiction crime writers
University of Arizona alumni
Amateur radio people
Writers from Buffalo, New York
Digital forensics people
People associated with computer security
Scientists from New York (state)
University at Buffalo alumni
Berkeley Macintosh Users Group members